Shock is a 1946 American film noir directed by Alfred L. Werker and starring Vincent Price, Lynn Bari and Frank Latimore.

Plot

A young woman named Janet Stewart is anticipating the arrival of her husband and attempts to check into a hotel. They are meeting after years apart and have planned to meet at the hotel. During his military service he was presumed dead, but was a prisoner of war. Unfortunately, her cable requesting the reservation never arrived. The staff, after hearing her story, agree to provide a room for the night. Restless, she isn't sleeping. She hears a loud argument and goes to the balcony window where she witnesses a man striking his wife with a candlestick. The woman is killed.

The next morning, her husband arrives and attempts to surprise Janet. Instead, he discovers her sitting on the couch, staring into space. She has gone into a state of shock as a result of seeing the murder. The hotel doctor is called, but he suggests she see a specialist.

The specialist that she sees turns out to be Dr. Cross, the man who murdered his wife.

Cast
 Vincent Price as Dr. Richard Cross
 Lynn Bari as Elaine Jordan
 Frank Latimore as Lt. Paul Stewart
 Anabel Shaw as Janet Stewart
 Stephen Dunne as Dr. Stevens (as Michael Dunne)
 Reed Hadley as O'Neill
 Renee Carson as Mrs. Hatfield
 Ruth Nelson As Mrs. Margaret Cross (Uncredited)
 Charles Trowbridge as Dr. Franklin Harvey

Production
The film was originally to be directed by Henry Hathaway.

Reception
Above and beyond the typical characteristics of the horror film genre, reviewer Bosley Crowther of The New York Times took particular offense to the film's treatment of psychiatry. Coming in the wake of World War II, in which so many people had suffered shock and could benefit from treatment of their anxieties, Crowther asked the "critical observer to protest in no uncertain tones" the movie's "social disservice" in its fostering "apprehension against the treatment of nervous disorders", deploring the lack of consideration for those in need of treatment evidenced by producer Aubrey Schenck and distributor Twentieth Century-Fox.  Philip K. Scheuer of the Los Angeles Times took no such offense, calling the film a "nominal 'B' feature", which screenplay author "Eugene Ling and Director Alfred Werker have imbued... with a grade-A suspense".  Jonathan Malcolm Lampley wrote in Women in the Horror Films of Vincent Price that his role in this film "foreshadows the mad doctors and scientists Price would frequently portray in his later career".

See also
 List of films in the public domain in the United States

References

External links

 
 
 
 
 

1946 films
1940s psychological thriller films
20th Century Fox films
American black-and-white films
American thriller films
Film noir
Films directed by Alfred L. Werker
Films scored by David Buttolph
Films set in psychiatric hospitals
Uxoricide in fiction
1940s English-language films
1940s American films